Stuart James Gardiner (born 19 March 1947) is a South African former cricketer.

Gardiner was born at Blomfontein in March 1947. He made his debut in first-class cricket for Orange Free State against Griqualand West at Blomfontein in the 1967–68 Currie Cup. He played first-class cricket for Orange Free State until the 1973–74 Currie Cup, making 25 appearances. Playing as a left-arm medium pace bowler, Gardiner took 98 wickets in his 25 appearances for Orange Free State, at an average of 22.84 and best figures of 6 for 49. These figures, one of five five wicket hauls he took, came against Northern Transvaal in the 1972–73 Currie Cup. As a lower-order batsman, he scored 485 runs at a batting average of 17.96 and a high score of 40 not out. Gardiner also made a single first-class appearance for a Combined Section B XI against D. H. Robins' XI in January 1973. He also played List A one-day cricket, debuting for Orange Free State against Eastern Province in the 1970–71 Gillette Cup. He made five List A appearances for Orange Free State, as well as making a single appearance for Northern Transvaal in the 1974–75 Gillette Cup.

He later studied in England at St John's College, Cambridge. While studying at Cambridge, he made eight appearances for Cambridge University in 1978, in addition to making two appearances for the Combined Universities cricket team in the 1978 Benson & Hedges Cup.

References

External links

1947 births
Living people
People from Bloemfontein
South African cricketers
Free State cricketers
Northerns cricketers
Alumni of St John's College, Cambridge
Cambridge University cricketers
British Universities cricketers